Rhopalodon is an extinct genus of therapsids from the Permian of Russia. It has been variously classified as a dinosaur, a dinocephalian, or another branch of Reptilia. Rhopalodon is notable for being among the first reptiles mentioned in Nature. T.H. Huxley wrote of this reptile, among others, in the inaugural issue of the magazine, in November 1869.  He gave the age of this animal and of the contemporary Deuterosaurus as Triassic, but both are now known to have lived during the Middle Permian.

According to Tverdokhlebov et al. (2005), Rhopalodon was a medium-sized terrestrial dinocephalian herbivore that was characteristic of the early Tatarian Urzhumian biostratigraphic zone (Bolshekinelskaya and Amanakskaya svitas).

See also
 List of therapsids

References

 http://www.nature.com/nature/about/first/triassic.html
 http://dml.cmnh.org/1999Nov/msg00820.html
 Valentin P.  Tverdokhlebov, Galina I. Tverdokhlebova, Alla V.  Minikh, Mikhail V.  Surkov, and Michael J.  Benton, (2005)  Upper Permian vertebrates and their sedimentological context in the South Urals, Russia, Earth-Science Reviews 69 27-77 55

Dinocephalians
Prehistoric therapsid genera
Guadalupian synapsids
Extinct animals of Russia
Fossil taxa described in 1841
Guadalupian genus first appearances
Guadalupian genus extinctions